Kavadi Aattam is a ceremonial sacrifice and offering practiced by devotees during the worship of Murugan, a regional form of Kartikeya, the Hindu god of war. It is a central part of the festival of Thaipusam and emphasizes debt bondage. The kavadi ("burden") itself is a physical burden, the bearing of which is used by the devotee to implore Murugan for assistance, usually on behalf of a loved one who is in need of healing, or as a means of balancing a spiritual debt. Devotees process and dance along a pilgrimage route while bearing these burdens.

Legend
The myth behind the practice of the kavadi aattam is steeped in Tamil mythology. At Mount Kailash, Shiva is said to have entrusted the sage Agastya with two hillocks, the Shivagiri hill, and the Shaktigiri hill, with instructions to carry and install them in South India. The sage left them in a forest and later asked his disciple, Idumban, to get them. Idumban found the two hillocks, but could not initially lift them, until he obtained divine help. Near Palani in South India — where there is a famous shrine of Murugan — Idumban put the hillocks down, to rest awhile. When he attempted to continue with his journey, he found that the hillocks were immovable. Idumban sought the help of a scantily dressed youth, but the youth claimed the hillocks belonged to him. In the ensuing scuffle, Idumban was defeated. Idumban then realised that the youth was Murugan, and became his fervent devotee. 

Murugan had previously been outwitted in a contest for going round the world where his brother, Vinayakar, had won the jñāna paḻam, the fruit of wisdom. In his anger, the frustrated child left the divine parents and came down to Tiru Avinankudi at Adivâram, the foot of the Sivagiri Hill. Shiva pacified his son by stating that he himself was the fruit of all wisdom. Later, Murugan withdrew to the hill, and settled there as a recluse in peace and solitude.

Idumban is said to have prayed that whoever carried on his shoulders the kavadi — signifying the two hills — and visited the temple on a vow should be blessed and that he (Idumban) should be given the privilege of standing sentinel at the entrance to the hill.

Hence, an Idumban shrine is halfway up the hill, where every pilgrim is expected to offer obeisance to Idumban before entering the temple of Dandâyudhapani. Since then, pilgrims to Palani bring their offerings on their shoulders in a kavadi aattam. The custom has spread from Palani to all Murugan shrines worldwide.

Religious practices
The preparations start 48 days before the two-day Thaipusam festival. The devotees purge themselves of all mental and physical impurities. They take only one vegetarian meal per day and 24 hours before Thaipusam, they must maintain a complete fast. The devotees prepare themselves by following strict purification austerities that include:

 Transcendence of desire
 Shaving of the head
 Following a vegetarian diet and refraining from alcohol
 Sexual abstinence
 Bathing in cold water
 Sleeping on the floor
 Constant prayers

Pilgrimage

On the day of the festival, devotees undertake a pilgrimage along a set route while engaging in various acts of devotion, notably carrying various types of kavadi (burdens). At its simplest this may entail carrying a pot of milk (pal kavadi), but piercing the skin, tongue or cheeks with vel skewers is also common.

A more elaborate kavadi consists of two semicircular pieces of wood or steel which are bent and attached to a cross structure that can be balanced on the shoulders of the devotee. It is often decorated with flowers and peacock feathers (the vehicle of Murugan) among other things. Some of the kavadi can weigh up to 30 kg.

The most spectacular practice is the vel kavadi, essentially a portable altar up to two meters tall, decorated with peacock feathers and attached to the devotee through 108 vels pierced into the skin on the chest and back. Fire walking and flagellation may also be practiced. It is claimed that devotees are able to enter a trance, feel no pain, do not bleed from their wounds and have no scars left behind.

Outside India 

Thaipusam is celebrated in many different countries outside of India mainly in Sri Lanka, Malaysia, Fiji, Mauritius, Singapore, Canada, United States United Kingdom, Germany, France, Italy, South Africa, Indonesia, Reunion island etc.

Picture gallery

See also
 Batu Caves
 Kanwar Yatra
 Yajna
 Nagarathar Kavadi

References

External links

tamilnadu-tourism.com

Objects used in Hindu worship
Rituals in Hindu worship
Yajna
Articles containing video clips
Kaumaram
Tamil mythology